Djamal Fassassi (born 23 November 1988) is a Beninese football midfielder who plays for Dragons.

References

External links

1988 births
Living people
Beninese footballers
Benin international footballers
AS Oussou Saka players
AS Dragons FC de l'Ouémé players
USS Kraké players
Cercle Mbéri Sportif players
Association football midfielders
Beninese expatriate footballers
Expatriate footballers in Gabon
Beninese expatriate sportspeople in Gabon